Kotashaan (foaled May 4, 1988 in Orne, France) was a Thoroughbred racehorse who competed in France and earned Champion honors in the United States.

Background
He was bred and raced by brothers Alain and Gérard Wertheimer, owners of the House of Chanel in Paris. Kotashaan was sired by Darshaan, winner of the 1984 French Derby and the Leading sire in France in 2003. His dam was Haute Authorite, a daughter of the American runner Elocutionist who in 1976 won the second leg of the U.S. Triple Crown series, the Preakness Stakes.

Racing career

France
Trained by Criquette Head-Maarek, the world's most successful female trainer, Kotashann made his racing debut on November 16, 1990. He finished second in a maiden race at Saint-Cloud Racecourse then two weeks later got his first win at Maisons-Laffitte Racecourse. At age three in 1991, he debuted in April with a fifth-place finish in the Prix Noailles then won his next two starts, capturing the listed  Prix de Courcelles and the Group 3 Prix La Force. Kotashann contested his first Group One race on June 23, 1991, finishing third to Subotica in the Grand Prix de Paris. He followed this up with another third-place effort in the August 15th G2 Prix Guillaume d'Ornano and a second-place finish on September 9 in the G3 La Coupe de Maisons-Laffitte.

United States
The Wertheimer brothers decided to send Kotashaan to compete in turf races in the United States, where they raced their horses under the name of La Presle Farm. Under California trainer Richard Mandella, he was limited by an injury and made just four starts in 1992, winning only one minor race. In top form in 1993, though, Kotashaan won six of ten starts with three runnerup finishes, and earned more than US$2.6 million. He did lose three races to top turf horse Star of Cozzene in late 1992 and early 1993. He won five major California races at distances from 1⅛ miles to 1¾ miles including the San Juan Capistrano Handicap in track-record time. He then capped it off with a win in the November 6, 1993, Breeders' Cup Turf at Santa Anita Park. In the Turf, Kotashaan defeated a strong field that included runnerup Bien Bien, defending Breeders' Cup Turf champion, Fraise (4), Hatoof (5), King George VI and Queen Elizabeth Stakes winner, Opera House (6), and French Derby winner, Hernando (10). 

Following his Breeders' Cup win, Kotashaan was sold to a Japanese syndicate. For his new owners, he made his final start of 1993, and of his racing career, in the November 28 Japan Cup. Ridden by his regular American jockey, Kent Desormeaux, Kotashaan finished second to Legacy World after Desormeaux misjudged the finish line.

Honors
Kotashaan's 1993 performances earned him the Eclipse Award for American Champion Male Turf Horse, plus the highest honor in United States' Thoroughbred racing, American Horse of the Year.

Stud record
Retired to stud duty, he stood in Japan until 2000 when Andrew (Willy) Murphy purchased him and brought him to stand at Ballycurragh Stud in Rathoe, County Carlow, Ireland.   He has had little success as a sire.

References

 Kotashaan's pedigree and partial racing stats
 Kotashaan at the Aga Khan Stud
 Video at YouTube of Kotashaan winning the 1993 Breeders' Cup Turf

1988 racehorse births
Racehorses bred in France
Racehorses trained in France
Racehorses trained in the United States
American Thoroughbred Horse of the Year
Eclipse Award winners
Breeders' Cup Turf winners
Thoroughbred family 19-a